Standard Operating Procedure is a 2008 American documentary film written and directed by Errol Morris that explores the meaning of the photographs taken by U.S. military police at the Abu Ghraib prison in late 2003, the content of which revealed the torture and abuse of its prisoners by U.S. soldiers and subsequently resulted in a public scandal. 

Commenting on the relationship of his film to the notorious photographs, Morris has said his intent was "…not to say that these 'bad apples' were blameless… but… to say that they were scapegoats. It was easy to blame them because, after all, they were in the photographs… Photographs don’t tell us who the real culprits might be… They can also serve as a coverup, they can misdirect us… Photographs reveal and conceal, serve as [both] exposé and coverup".

Synopsis
An examination of the intended consequences of the Iraqi war with a focus on events at Abu Ghraib prison which began to appear in global media in 2004. The prison quickly became notorious for the photos of the abuse of terror suspects, their children, and innocent civilians by military men and women.

People featured in the film

Interviewed
Janis Karpinski, Brigadier General, 800th MP Brigade
Tim Dugan, Civilian interrogator, CACI Corps
Sabrina Harman, Sergeant, Military Police
Lynndie England, Private First Class, MP
Javal Davis, Sergeant, MP
Megan Ambuhl Graner, Specialist, MP
Jeremy Sivits, Specialist, MP
Brent Pack, Army Special Agent, CID
Ken Davis, Sergeant, MP
Tony Diaz, Sergeant, MP
Jeffrey Frost, Specialist, MP
Roman Krol, Specialist, Military Intelligence

In photographs
Charles Graner
Ivan Frederick
Manadel al-Jamadi (Died during CIA interrogation)
Satar Jabar

Re-enactors
Christopher Bradley
Sarah Denning
Joshua Feinman
Alim Kouliev

Critical reception
The film appeared on several critics' top ten lists of the best films of 2008. Scott Tobias of The A.V. Club named it the 4th best film of 2008, J.R. Jones of the Chicago Reader named it the 7th best film of 2008, and Kenneth Turan of the Los Angeles Times named it the 8th best film of 2008 (in a two-way tie).

During the Berlinale 2008 it received the "Jury Grand Prix – Silver Bear".

Controversy
Morris's practice of compensating his interview subjects has caused controversy, although it is not an unusual practice in documentary filmmaking, according to the producer Diane Weyermann, who also worked on An Inconvenient Truth. In a private interview during the Tribeca Film Festival, Morris said: "If I had not paid them, they would not be interviewed."

Soundtrack

Danny Elfman composed the film score for Standard Operating Procedure. The soundtrack is much different from Elfman's other scores as it includes electronics and distortion.

Track listing
"S.O.P. Theme #1: Standard Operating Procedure" – 5:56
"The Infamous Pyramid" – 3:48
"Photos" – 2:56
"The Shooter" – 3:26
"Dogs" – 3:42
"The Wolf" – 1:11
"Saddam’s Egg" – 3:30
"Main Titles: Vacation in Iraq" – 2:07
"S.O.P. Theme #2: Amnesty" – 1:33
"What Is Going on Here?" – 2:32
"Gilligan" – 3:02
"Story of the Ants" – 3:36
"The Table Breaker" – 1:00
"S.O.P. Theme #3: Feelings & Facts" – 5:26
"Unusual, Weird & Wrong" – 2:32
"A Bad Feeling" – 2:22
"Birdies" – 1:38
"S.O.P. End Credits" – 1:26
"Oli’s Lullaby" – 2:00

See also
2008 in film
372nd Military Police Company, the MP unit assigned to Abu Ghraib
Taxi to the Dark Side
Torturing Democracy

References

External links
 
 
 
 
 
 
 EyeForFilm.co.uk – Tribeca Film Festival Q&A with Errol Morris about the film
 Berlinale 2008

2008 films
American documentary films
Documentary films about the Iraq War
Abu Ghraib torture and prisoner abuse
Films directed by Errol Morris
Sony Pictures Classics films
2008 documentary films
Films scored by Danny Elfman
Participant (company) films
Documentary films about torture
Silver Bear Grand Jury Prize winners
2000s English-language films
2000s American films